Graeme Saunders may refer to:
 Graeme Saunders (footballer) (born 1938), Australian rules footballer for North Melbourne
 Graeme Saunders (sailor) (born 1990), Canadian Olympic sailor